Caigua Airport,  is an airport serving the gas pipeline construction in the Cordillera Central,  west of Villamontes in the Tarija Department of Bolivia.

The airport is alongside the Huacaya River, a minor tributary of the Pilcomayo River.

See also

Transport in Bolivia
List of airports in Bolivia

References

External links 
OpenStreetMap - Caigua
OurAirports - Caigua
Fallingrain - Caigua Airport

Airports in Tarija Department